This article shows the rosters of all participating teams at the women's volleyball tournament at the 2012 Summer Paralympics in London.

Pool A

The following is the Japanese roster in the women's volleyball tournament of the 2012 Summer Paralympics.

The following is the British roster in the women's volleyball tournament of the 2012 Summer Paralympics.

The following is the Dutch roster in the women's volleyball tournament of the 2012 Summer Paralympics.

The following is the Ukrainian roster in the women's volleyball tournament of the 2012 Summer Paralympics.

Pool B

The following is the Brazilian roster in the women's volleyball tournament of the 2012 Summer Paralympics.

The following is the Chinese roster in the women's volleyball tournament of the 2012 Summer Paralympics.

The following is the Slovenian roster in the women's volleyball tournament of the 2012 Summer Paralympics.

The following is the American roster in the women's volleyball tournament of the 2012 Summer Paralympics.

See also
Volleyball at the 2012 Summer Paralympics – Men's team rosters

References

External links
FIVB official website

O
2
Women's team rosters
2012 in women's volleyball